Alto Hama is a town, with a population of 17,000 (2014), and a commune of Angola, located in the province of Huambo.

See also 

 Communes of Angola

References 

Populated places in Angola